Pedro Antonio Nikken Bellshaw (12 June 1945 – 9 December 2019) was a Venezuelan lawyer and  jurist.

Background 
He studied law at the Andrés Bello Catholic University Law School, graduating in 1968. In 1973 he obtained a diploma from higher studies at the University of Paris II Panthéon-Assas and in 1977, a doctorate in law from the University of Carabobo.

Career 
He was professor and dean of the Faculty of Juridical and Political Sciences of the Central University of Venezuela.

Between October 1979 and 1989 he was judge of the Inter-American Court of Human Rights, being also its vice president between 1981 and 1983, and president between 1983 and 1985. In 1988 he was vice president of the Inter-American Institute of Human Rights.

In the 1990s, the United Nations appointed him as legal advisor to the mediation that ended the Salvadoran Civil War.

Since 1997 he was a member of the Academy of Political and Social Sciences of Venezuela.

In 2017 he received an honorary doctorate from the University of Buenos Aires.

References 

1945 births
2019 deaths
People from Caracas
20th-century Venezuelan judges
Venezuelan human rights activists
Inter-American Court of Human Rights judges
Academic staff of the Central University of Venezuela
Andrés Bello Catholic University alumni
People of the Salvadoran Civil War
21st-century Venezuelan lawyers
Venezuelan jurists